Trombetta is a surname. Notable people with the surname include:

Cristian Trombetta (born 1986), Argentine footballer
Ezechiele Trombetta (1834–1903), Italian sculptor
Luigi Trombetta (1820–1900), Italian cardinal
Maurizio Trombetta (born 1962), Italian former football player
Otello Trombetta (born 1915), Italian professional football player